P. Surendran (born 4 November 1961) is an Indian writer, columnist, art critic and a philanthropist. He has published over 30 books, including works of fiction, travelogues and general writings, in Malayalam and also a collection of short stories in English.He was a Malayalam teacher at Kumaranellur School, Palakkad district. He is a recipient of the Kerala Sahitya Akademi Award (2003, 2013).

Early life
P. Surendran was born in Pappinippara, Manjeri, Kerala to Kumaran Nair and Sarojini Amma. He has two sisters and a brother. His family later shifted to Vattamkulam near Edappal. He did his schooling from Edappal. He is currently working in Kumaranellur School, Palakkad district.

Literary life
An accomplished writer and art critic in Malayalam, Surendran has won many awards including the Kerala Sahitya Akademi Award, Abu Dhabhi Shakthi Award, Odakkuzhal Award and Padmarajan Award among others. His book on the famous artist A. Ramachandran won the Kerala Lalithakala Akademi's award for the best book on art criticism. His stories have been translated into English, Hindi and other Indian languages. Surendran came to the limelight of Kerala's literary circle after he won first prize in the short story competition conducted by Mathrubhumi Weekly in 1981. His first collection of stories, Piriyan Govani, was published in 1986. Surendran has published over 30 books, including fictions, travelogues and general writings, in Malayalam and also a collection of short stories in English. His latest novel, Greeshma Mapini, roughly based on the life of former Kerala chief minister V. S. Achuthanandan, is published by DC Books. His latest book on veteran artist Yusuf Arakkal, called Velichathinte Paryayangal, is published by DC Books and Gallerie Sara Arakkal.

Works

Collections

 Abhayarthikalude Poonthottam (അഭയാർത്ഥികളുടെ പൂന്തോട്ടം)
 Bermuda (ബർമുഡ)
 Bhumiyude Nilavili (ഭൂമിയുടെ നിലവിളി)
 Che (ചെ)
 Chinese Market (ചൈനീസ് മാർക്കറ്റ്)
 Haritha Vidyalayam (ഹരിത വിദ്യാലയം)
 Jalasandhi (ജലസന്ധി)
 Karutha Prarthanakal (കറുത്ത പ്രാർത്ഥനകൾ)
 Piriyan Govani (പിരിയൻ ഗോവണി)
 Rashtriya Kathakal (രാഷ്ട്രീയ കഥകൾ)
 Thiranjedutha Kathakal (തിരഞ്ഞെടുത്ത കഥകൾ)

Autobiography
 Elanchipoomanamulla Nattuvayikal (ഇലഞിപ്പൂമണമൂള്ള നാട്ടുവഴികൾ)

Novels
 Greeshmamapini {ഗ്രീഷ്മമാപിന}
 Kaveriyude Purushan {കാവേരിയുടെ പുരുഷൻ}
 Jaivam {ജൈവം}
 Mahayanam {മഹായാനം}
 Mayapuranam {മായാപുരാണം}
 Samoohyapatam {സാമൂഹ്യപാഠം}

Translations
 Synonyms for Sea, Translated by Elzy Taramangalam and published by Rupa & Co.

Small information about "synonyms of Ocean"

     In his "synonyms of Ocean" where we see the western explorer Marina Salazer's fascination with the adventures of ancestors trying to chart the ancient sea route with the help of Marakkaiar. The juxtaposition the two characters from the extreme ends of history paves way for treacherous journey of vengeance.

Awards
He has published many award-winning books in Malayalam, including collections of short stories, novels, travel sketches and art criticism. He won the Kerala Lalitakala Akademi Award and Kerala Sahitya Akademi Award for Story for his collection of short stories, Jalasandhi. Gramapathakal won the Kerala Sahitya Akademi Award for Travelogue in 2013. He has also won many other awards including V. P. Sivakumar Award, SBT award, Abu Dhabi Sakti award, Odakkuzhal award, Padmarajan Award, etc.

Personal life
P. Surendran is married to Sujatha. They have 2 sons. They live in Vattamkulam, Edappal.

References

External links 

 Excerpts from Greeshma mapini
 Odakkuzhal award
 Biodata
 Translation of a story
 നക്സല്‍ ബാരിയിലൂടെ (Article of Naxalism: Part 1)
 നക്സല്‍ ബാരിയിലൂടെ (Article of Naxalism: Part 2)
 ചാരുമജൂംദാറിന്‍െറ വീട് (Article of Naxalism: Part 3)

Living people
1961 births
People from Malappuram district
Indian art critics
Indian columnists
Poets from Kerala
Malayalam-language writers
Malayalam literary critics
Malayalam novelists
Malayalam short story writers
Recipients of the Kerala Sahitya Akademi Award
Manjeri
20th-century Indian short story writers
Indian male short story writers
Indian male novelists
20th-century Indian novelists
Novelists from Kerala
20th-century Indian male writers